Dominika Luzarová (born 18 July 1982) is a former Czech tennis player. She was born in Přerov, and won a total of ten ITF titles during her career, in which she reached a doubles ranking high of world no. 180.

ITF Circuit finals

ITF Circuit singles: 5 (2–3)

ITF Circuit doubles: 10 (8–2)

References 
 
 

1982 births
Living people
Sportspeople from Přerov
Czech female tennis players
21st-century Czech women